The Embassy of Uzbekistan in London is the diplomatic mission of Uzbekistan in the United Kingdom. Diplomatic relations between the two countries dates from 1992.

Gallery

References

External links
Official site

Uzbekistan
Diplomatic missions of Uzbekistan
United Kingdom–Uzbekistan relations
Buildings and structures in the Royal Borough of Kensington and Chelsea
Holland Park